Rhynchorhamphus arabicus or Arabian flyingfish is a halfbeak of the family Hemiramphidae of the order Beloniformes.

It is one of the four recognized species of the genus Rhynchorhamphus and can be found in the Western Indian Ocean, near Yemen and Somalia.

References

Further reading

</ref>

arabicus
Fish described in 1972